Deux-Montagnes is a regional county municipality in the Laurentides region of Quebec, Canada. It is located immediately north of Laval on the north shore of the Rivière des Mille-Îles and on the north shore of the Lake of Two Mountains.  Its seat and largest city is Saint-Eustache.

The municipality has a land area of 242.88 km2 and its population was 102,052 residents as of the 2021 Census.

Subdivisions
There are 7 subdivisions and one native reserve within the RCM:

Cities & Towns (3)
 Deux-Montagnes
 Sainte-Marthe-sur-le-Lac
 Saint-Eustache

Municipalities (4)
 Oka
 Pointe-Calumet
 Saint-Joseph-du-Lac
 Saint-Placide

Native Reserves (1)
 Kanesatake Mohawk Reserve

Demographics

Population

Language

Transportation

Access Routes
Highways and numbered routes that run through the municipality, including external routes that start or finish at the county border:

 Autoroutes
 

 Principal Highways
 

 Secondary Highways
 

 External Routes
 None

See also
 List of regional county municipalities and equivalent territories in Quebec
 CIT Laurentides
 Deux-Montagnes (AMT)

References

Regional county municipalities in Laurentides
Census divisions of Quebec